Tong Zhe (born 8 May 1987) is a Chinese educator known as the founder of One-Man University, an online learning platform with over 140,000 enrolled students as of 2015

Degree disputes
There have been disputes about Tong's misleading advertising about his degrees. Tong has used ambiguous words such as "undergraduate study at PKU, master's study at ENS" ("北大本，高师硕") to mislead his audience to believe that he had gained a B.S. degree at Peking University and a master's degree at ENS Paris. Forced by the large waves of criticism about this conduct, Tong then posted a blog to clarify his degree situation.

References

People from Xiamen
Educators from Fujian
Peking University alumni
École Normale Supérieure alumni
1987 births
Living people